Aunesis was a coastal town of ancient Pamphylia or of Cilicia, inhabited during Roman times. It was the port of Hamaxia.

Its site is located below Hamaxia, in Asiatic Turkey.

References

Populated places in ancient Cilicia
Populated places in ancient Pamphylia
Former populated places in Turkey
Roman towns and cities in Turkey
History of Antalya Province